Pekka Olavi Haavisto (born 23 March 1958) is a Finnish politician of the Green League who has been serving as the Minister for Foreign Affairs since 2019. 

Haavisto returned to the Finnish Parliament in the Finnish parliamentary election of March 2007 after an absence of 12 years and was re-elected in 2011, 2015, and 2019. Between April 1995 and April 1999 he was the Minister of Environment in the Lipponen I Cabinet. In October 2013 he was appointed as the Minister for International Development after Heidi Hautala resigned from the job. He has also been a member of the Helsinki City Council. He was also a candidate for the 2012 Finnish presidential election and 2018 Finnish presidential election coming second and losing to Sauli Niinistö in both times. Haavisto became the first openly gay candidate to run for the presidency of Finland. 

At the end of 2019, the Ministry of Foreign Affairs' plan for the repatriation of Finnish family members of ISIS fighters in the al-Hawl refugee camp made headlines. In December 2020, the Parliament's Constitutional Law Committee found that foreign minister Haavisto, who had pushed for Finnish children from the al-Hawl refugee camp to be brought to Finland, had broken Finnish law by trying to replace a foreign ministry official who refused to act after a difference of opinion over the repatriation. However, the Committee declared it had not found reason to bring criminal charges against him. Afterwards, the parliament had a vote of confidence on Haavisto. The result was 101–68 in favor of Haavisto. Only one government party member, Hannu Hoskonen of the Centre party, voted "no confidence".

Political career

Haavisto was a member of the Parliament of Finland from 1987 to 1995. He was the chairperson of the Green League from 1993 to 1995. He served as the Minister of the Environment in Paavo Lipponen's first cabinet between 1995 and 1999. He was the first European cabinet minister representing a Green party.

From 1999 to 2005, Haavisto worked for the United Nations in various tasks. He led the United Nations Environment Programme (UNEP) research groups in Kosovo, Afghanistan, Iraq, Liberia, Palestine and Sudan. He also coordinated the UN investigation in the effects of depleted uranium in Kosovo, Montenegro, Serbia and Bosnia and Herzegovina. Haavisto also represented the UNEP in the investigations in the Baia Mare mining accident in Romania. In 2005 he was appointed as the special representative of the European Union in Sudan where he participated in the Darfur peace talks.

In 2007 and 2011 Haavisto was re-elected to the Parliament from the electoral district of Helsinki.

Presidential election 2012

In 2011, Haavisto was nominated as the Green League candidate for the Finnish presidential election of 2012. In the first round of the election on 22 January 2012, he finished second with 18.8 percent of the votes. In the run-off on 5 February, he garnered more than one million votes (37.4 percent), yet still losing to the National Coalition Party candidate, former Finance Minister Sauli Niinistö.
Haavisto was the first openly gay candidate and the first male candidate to have served in non-military service instead of the regular military service to make it to the second round of presidential elections in Finland.

Presidential election 2018
In February 2017, Haavisto announced that he would reprise his candidacy in the 2018 presidential election. The decision came after Haavisto had been approached multiple times by the Green League. In the election, Haavisto placed second with 12.4 percent of the votes, while president Niinistö went on to secure his second term with a majority of votes.

Return as chairman
In October 2018, the chairman of the Green League Touko Aalto announced that he is resigning from his post, citing depression and fatigue. The decision prompted an immediate leadership election, with the goal to elect a temporary chairman to lead the party into the 2019 parliamentary elections and until the next party convention. As many members of the party called for more prominent and experienced politicians to take part in the election, Haavisto announced his candidacy. On 4 November 2018, he defeated MP Outi Alanko-Kahiluoto in a leadership election and was thus chosen to lead the party.

In June 2019, Haavisto stepped down as the chairman of the party. He was succeeded by Maria Ohisalo.

Minister of Foreign Affairs, 2019–present

Following their best ever result in the 2019 national elections and after becoming part of the incoming governing coalition under the leadership of Prime Minister Antti Rinne, the Green League named Haavisto as the next foreign minister. In this capacity, he chaired the meetings of the Foreign Affairs Council during Finland’s rotating presidency of the Council of the European Union in 2019.

In 2019, Haavisto called for the EU to intensify efforts on improving relations with Russia in the face of international conflict, transatlantic tensions and Brexit.

In December 2020, the Parliament's Constitutional Law Committee found that Haavisto, who had pushed for Finnish children from the al-Hawl refugee camp in northern Syria to be brought to Finland quickly in late 2019, had broken Finnish law by trying to replace a foreign ministry official who refused to act after a difference of opinion over the exact repatriation proceedings. The events were leaked to the press causing a political crisis. Haavisto quickly reverted his decision to demote the official and offered him the same position as earlier. The Committee declared it had not found reason to bring criminal charges against the foreign minister, but specified that Haavisto had operated in contravention to the Administration Law and the Foreign Relations Act. Two Green League MPs published a dissenting opinion and advocated for a softer verdict, causing controversy in the Committee. In Parliament, Haavisto received the Parliament's support in a 101-68 interpellation vote. Haavisto's decision of returning the refugees received the Parliament's support on a 110-79 interpellation vote.

In February and March 2021, Haavisto was under criminal investigation for an alleged Highway Code violation in December 2020. The complaint originated from a video recorded by a reporter for the gossip magazine Seiska, which included commentary that Haavisto had not stopped for two pedestrian crossings. The prosecutor who reviewed the video evidence decided to not to press charges, citing construction work that had disabled the first crossing and created an unclear situation for the other.

Haavisto was appointed EU's special envoy to Ethiopia during the Tigray War. In February 2021, Haavisto stated that violence and suffering in Ethiopia was "out of control" and could cause a large refugee crisis. In June 2021, he briefed the European Parliament on the conflict. Haavisto warned of a possible ethnic cleansing of Tigrayans, stating that Ethiopia's leaders in closed-door talks said "they are going to wipe out the Tigrayans for 100 years." Ethiopia's foreign ministry dismissed Haavisto's comments as "ludicrous" and a "hallucination of sorts or a lapse in memory of some kind." Haavisto stated that Ethiopian criticism will have no effect on his work as envoy and referred to an upcoming UN human rights report on the situation.

On 17 May 2022, Haavisto signed Finland's application to join NATO. Haavisto visited Kyiv in November, stating that "Finland strongly condemns Russia's illegal invasion of Ukraine. We will continue our firm support to Ukraine as long as necessary."

Other activities
 European Council on Foreign Relations (ECFR), Member (since 2021)
 European Institute of Peace (EIP), Chairman of the Board of Governors (since 2016)

Personal life
After completing the matriculation examination of the upper secondary school, Haavisto began studying social sciences at the University of Helsinki but did not complete the degree.
As a young man he chose non-military service over armed service in the Defence Forces.

Haavisto is openly gay. Although his homosexuality was an open rumor during the 1990s, his sexual orientation wasn't public until 2002, when he entered in a registered partnership with Antonio Flores, an Ecuadorian man. They have been together since 1997 when they met in a Bogotá night club.

According to the ranking of the Finnish Ulkopolitiikka magazine in 2009, Haavisto was internationally the 5th most influential person in Finland.

Honors 

  Order of the Lion of Finland (Finland, 2022)
  Military merit medal (Finland, 2008)
  Legion of Honour (France, 2019)

References

External links 

 Personal website

|-

|-

1958 births
Living people
Politicians from Helsinki
Green League politicians
Minister of the Environment of Finland
Ministers for Foreign Affairs of Finland
Members of the Parliament of Finland (1987–91)
Members of the Parliament of Finland (1991–95)
Members of the Parliament of Finland (2007–11)
Members of the Parliament of Finland (2011–15)
Members of the Parliament of Finland (2015–19)
Members of the Parliament of Finland (2019–23)
Candidates for President of Finland
Gay politicians
Gay diplomats
Finnish LGBT politicians
Finnish gay men
Articles containing video clips
LGBT legislators
Waldorf school alumni